The Musket 250 is a NASCAR Whelen Modified Tour race at New Hampshire Motor Speedway. The Whelen Modified Series has been racing since September 2, 1990. This race was originally 125 laps, but in 1997 was reduced to 100 laps. This race was held during the ISM Connect 300 race weekend until 2017 when Las Vegas replaced Loudon in the NASCAR playoffs.  As a result, starting in 2018, the September race at Loudon now features the Modifieds as the feature division, with a 250 lap, 264.5 mile event, the all-time record of distance of Whelen Modified Tour in the touring format.  In 1969 and 1970, Martinsville Speedway ran the NASCAR Modified Division with 263-mile races (500 laps). The ARCA Menards Series East (formally K&N Pro East) will continue to be part of the schedule, but the NASCAR Pinty's Series from Canada replaces the Cup Series on that weekend.

The race in 2020 was shortened to 200 laps due to the effect of the COVID-19 pandemic. In 2021 only 1 race occurred during the season at New Hampshire Motor Speedway. It was in July but it was the 100 lap Whelen 100 as the Musket event was cancelled for 2021 as was the full throttle weekend. When the 2022 Schedule was released on November 3rd, 2021 the only race listed for New Hampshire was the 100 lap race that accompanies the NASCAR Cup Series weekend in July.

The Modified cars during this race use a restrictor plate. This plate is similar to what the NASCAR Xfinity Series uses at Daytona International Speedway and Talladega Superspeedway.

Race Results

References 

Motorsport in New Hampshire
 
Recurring sporting events established in 1990
1990 establishments in New Hampshire